You've Come This Way Before is a 1968 album by American singer-songwriter Nancy Priddy.

Track listing
"You've Come This Way Before" – 2:52
"Ebony Glass" – 2:21
"Mystic Lady" – 6:32
"Christina's World" – 2:45
"We Could Have It All" – 2:41
"My Friend Frank" – 3:03
"O' Little Child" – 3:17
"And Who Will You Be Then" – 3:13
"On the Other Side of the River" – 2:34
"Epitaph" – 1:21

References

1968 albums
Albums produced by Phil Ramone
Dot Records albums
Nancy Priddy albums